The 5.8×21mm DAP is a Chinese armor-piercing cartridge for handguns and submachine guns.

Description
The cartridge was designed for replacements of 7.62×25mm Tokarev-chambered small arms for the People's Liberation Army that would offer a wound as large as a standard 9×19mm Parabellum round. This round is offered in both a standard, and subsonic version. Both the QSZ-92 service pistol and the QCW-05 submachine gun are produced in this caliber as well as 9×19mm Parabellum.

See also
  4.38×30mm Libra
  5.45×18mm
  5 mm caliber
  FN 5.7×28mm

References

Pistol and rifle cartridges
Military cartridges
5.8 mm firearms
Weapons and ammunition introduced in 1994